Loncón and Loncon is a Mapuche surname found in present-day Chile and Argentina. Notable people with the surname include:

Elisa Loncón (born 1963), Chilean Mapuche linguist
José Loncón (born 1988), Argentine footballer

Surnames of Chilean origin
Mapuche